Hippopotamodon is a genus of extinct suid even-toed ungulates that existed during the Miocene and Pliocene in Europe and Asia.

References

Prehistoric Suidae
Miocene even-toed ungulates
Miocene mammals of Asia
Miocene mammals of Europe
Pliocene even-toed ungulates
Pliocene mammals of Asia
Pliocene mammals of Europe
Prehistoric even-toed ungulate genera